The men's eight competition at the 1976 Summer Olympics, also referred to as men's coxed eight (M8+), took place at the rowing basin on Notre Dame Island in Montreal, Quebec, Canada. It was held from 18 to 25 July and was won by the team from East Germany. It was East Germany's first victory in the event, improving on a bronze medal in 1972. The defending champions, New Zealand, switched places with the East Germans, taking bronze in 1972. Between them was Great Britain, taking its first men's eight medal since 1948. There were 11 boats (100 competitors, with Australia making one substitution) from 11 nations, with each nation limited to a single boat in the event.

Background

This was the 17th appearance of the event. Rowing had been on the programme in 1896 but was cancelled due to bad weather. The men's eight has been held every time that rowing has been contested, beginning in 1900.

Whilst the East German team was considered to be the favourite, the event was wide open and many teams could have won it. The United States had in the past dominated the event and up until and including the 1964 Summer Olympics, they had won nine out of ten Olympic golds. Whilst their dominance had since waned, they were still considered possible medal contenders, as they had won the 1974 World Rowing Championships. East Germany had won the 1973 European Rowing Championships (the event was discontinued after 1973), and the 1975 World Rowing Championships, and they had won bronze at the 1972 Olympics. The New Zealand team had won the event at the previous Summer Olympics, had won bronze at the last two World Rowing Championships, and four of their 1972 Olympic rowers plus their cox returned to Montreal. Other medalists at these major rowing events were Czechoslovakia, the Soviet Union, and Great Britain.

No nations made their debut in the event. The United States made its 15th appearance, most among nations to that point.

Previous M8+ competitions

Competition format

The "eight" event featured nine-person boats, with eight rowers and a coxswain. It was a sweep rowing event, with the rowers each having one oar (and thus each rowing on one side). This rowing competition consisted of two main rounds (semifinals and finals; down from three main rounds in 1927 with a smaller field), as well as a repechage round after the semifinals. The course used the 2000 metres distance that became the Olympic standard in 1912 (with the exception of 1948). Races were held in up to six lanes.

 Semifinals: Two heats with five or six boats each. The top boat in each semifinal (2 boats total) went to the "A" final, while the remaining boats went to the repechage.
 Repechage: Two heats with four or five boats each. The top two boats in each heat (4 boats total) advanced to the "A" final, with the remainder (5 boats) to the "B" final (out of medal contention).
 Finals: The "A" final consisted of the top six boats, competing for the medals and 4th through 6th place. The "B" final had the next five boats; they competed for 7th through 11th place.

Schedule

All times are Eastern Daylight Time (UTC-4)

Results

Semifinals

Semifinal 1

Semifinal 2

Repechage

Repechage heat 1

New Zealand changed seats for seven of its eight rowers. West Germany and Japan changed seats for all eight rowers. The Soviet team changed seats 1 to 7. The team from Cuba changed seats for seven rowers.

Repechage heat 2

Great Britain changed five of its seats, including the stroke. Czechoslovakia changed seats 2 to 6. Canada changed seven of the eight seats.

Finals

The two finals were rowed on 25 July. The only team that did not change seats during the competition was the United States.

Final B

Final A

East Germany changed five seats for the final. After Malcolm Shaw as stroke injured his back in the elimination race, Australia replaced him with Peter Shakespear for the final.

Notes

References

Volume 1 Part 1 (up to page 279)
Volume 1 Part 2 (from page 280)
Volume 2
Volume 3

Men's eight
Men's events at the 1976 Summer Olympics